The Prince of Wales riots occurred in Bombay, British India, between 19 and 22 November 1921 during the visit of Edward, Prince of Wales. The visit came during the non-cooperation movement protests for Indian self-rule, led by Mahatma Gandhi and the Indian National Congress. Gandhi had allied the mainly Hindu Congress with the Muslim Khilafat Movement, who were concerned about the possibility that the British might depose the Ottoman Caliph. Gandhi called for his supporters to boycott the prince's visit and carry out a general strike (hartal).

The Prince was welcomed by members of the Parsi, Jewish and Anglo-Indian minorities. These were attacked by a Hindu and Muslim mob who also burnt shops, trams and cars. Parsi-owned liquor shops were a particular target. Anglo-Indian and Parsi mobs formed in response to the violence and attacked those they suspected of supporting the non-cooperation movement. Gandhi was shocked by the violence and declared he would undertake a hunger strike until peace was restored. The violence abated on 22 November, at least 58 lives having been lost. After the riots the British imprisoned thousands of non-cooperation movement supporters and Gandhi attempted to rebuild the movement with support from the minorities as well as the Hindu-Muslim majority.

Background 

The visit of Edward, Prince of Wales to British India came in the middle of the non-cooperation movement protests for self-governance by the Indian people. This has been described as the greatest threat to British rule since the 1857 Indian Rebellion.  The non-cooperation movement had been started by pro-independence campaigner Mahatma Gandhi in September 1920. He had allied his mainly Hindu Indian National Congress with the Muslim Khilafat Movement to broaden the protest. The Khilafat supporters were particularly concerned in the immediate post-First World War years as they were worried that the British would depose the Ottoman Caliph, the spiritual leader of Islam. Hindus and Muslims together comprised a majority of the Indian population and minorities such as Christians, Sikhs, Parsis and Jews felt threatened by it. Gandhi stated that "The Hindu-Muslim entente does not mean that big communities should dominate small communities".

The non-cooperation movement advocated that Indians should use only Indian-made goods and boycotted imported products, particularly cloth. The movement also supported the withholding of taxes and strikes by students. The Parsi minority in Bombay Province were particularly affected by the anti-import stance. The Parsis were heavily involved in the liquor trade, which often involved imported goods. They accounted for 21% of alcohol dealers in the province, despite making up only 5% of the population. Gandhi was opposed the liquor trade in particular and advised the Parsis to leave it and support a prohibition on alcohol.

Prince Edward hoped that his visit would raise Loyalist sentiment in India and counter the non-cooperation movement. Gandhi called for a boycott of the visit and a general strike (hartal). The Indian National Congress agreed with the proposed strike and bonfires of foreign-made cloth were arranged to be held during the visit. The British government of India had imposed repressive measures against public assembly earlier in 1921. The Viceroy, Lord Reading, was keen to negotiate with Gandhi over the prince's visit to Calcutta in December but was prevented by the India Office that ordered that there would be no negotiations or concessions.

Riots 

When the Prince arrived in Bombay he was met with a mixture of silence, as Congress and Khilafat supporters stayed at home and closed their businesses, and crowds of Parsis, Jews and Anglo-Indians that turned out to support him. The support of the minorities outraged those who supported the hartal and the minority crowds were attacked by Hindus and Muslims. Future journalist Homai Vyarawalla witnessed the violence and recalled pitched battles in the streets with the marble stoppers of soda bottles and stones used as deadly projectiles.

In addition to the violence crowds set fire to shops, trams and cars. Parsi-owned liquor shops were particular targets and one sixth of all liquor establishments in the city were damaged. One store and the owner's attached home were only saved when he emptied his entire stock of alcohol into the gutter. In response Parsis and Anglo-Indians armed themselves with lathis and guns and sought to engage the Congress-Khilafat groups. Anyone wearing homespun khadi cloth, which had become a symbol of the anti-import campaign, was targeted. One of the Parsi and Anglo-Indian calls was "Down with the Gandhi caps", relating to the type of sidecap favoured by Gandhi and his supporters. Some Anglo-Indians and Parsis supported the National Congress, these people were at risk of attack from both sides of the riot.

Gandhi drove around the city trying to halt the violence, he was aggrieved to hear the Congress mob shouting "Mahatma Gandhi ki jai" (Hindi for: "Glory to Mahatma Gandhi"). At one point he came across two policemen dying from stab wounds inflicted by the mob. In response to the violence Gandhi began his hunger strike, vowing to neither eat nor drink until peace was restored. The riots, which began on 19 November, had abated by 22 November. At least 58 people were killed.

Aftermath 
Gandhi was shocked at what his peaceful strike had degenerated into and thought that it demonstrated the tinderbox of ethnicities that India was becoming. He was particularly disappointed that the Hindu-Muslim majorities had focussed their violence upon Indian minorities, which served to confirm their fears that an independent India would be subject to a violent tyranny of the majority. To allay their fears Gandhi spoke about providing political spaces for minorities and advocated "Hindu-Muslim-Sikh-Parsi-Christian-Jew unity". This was generally successful in reassuring the minorities that they had a future in an independent India.

By January 1922 thousands of Indians were imprisoned over the civil disobedience campaign, including hundreds of nationalist leaders. The campaign continued until the 4 February Chauri Chaura incident where a nationalist procession devolved into an attack on a police station, in which 22 Indian policemen were burned or hacked to death. Gandhi called an end to the non-cooperation movement, which was implemented despite opposition from fellow nationalist leaders Jawaharlal Nehru and Subhas Chandra Bose. Gandhi was arrested in March and sentenced to six years' imprisonment for sedition, though he was released on health grounds in 1924.

References 

Edward VIII
History of Mumbai
1921 riots
1921 in India
Crime in Mumbai
November 1921 events